Nordlys is a Norwegian newspaper published in Tromsø, covering the region of Troms, and the largest newspaper in Northern Norway.

History and profile
Nordlys was founded in 1902 by Alfred Eriksen, who also was its first editor-in-chief. The majority owner of the paper is A-Pressen. The paper is headquartered in Tromsø. It was an organ of the Labour Party.

Among the later editors are Ivan Kristoffersen, who edited the newspaper from 1982 to 1997, and Hans Kr. Amundsen who served in the position from 2001 to 2011. Its chief editor is Anders Opdahl.

Nordlys has been one of the major sponsors of the Tromsø International Film Festival since its inception in 1991.

The circulation of Nordlys was 28,000 copies in 2005. In 2008 the paper had a circulation of 26,714 copies. It was 26,000 copies in 2009.

References

External links
 Web edition

1902 establishments in Norway
Amedia
Labour Party (Norway) newspapers
Mass media in Tromsø
Newspapers published in Norway
Norwegian-language newspapers
Publications established in 1902
Socialist newspapers